Tadevos Hakobyan (15 June 191715 October 1989) was a Soviet Armenian historian and geographer.

Biography 
Hakobyan was born in Lernadzor village in Armenia's southern province of Syunik. In 1940 he graduated from the Faculty of Geography-Geology of the Yerevan State University (YSU). He was the dean of the YSU's Faculty of Geography in 1955-57 and 1963-65. He thereafter served as the chair of that department between 1962 and 1986. Most of his work was focused on the historical geography of Armenia. Together with Stepan Melik-Bakhshyan and Hovhannes Barseghyan, he authored the monumental five-volume Dictionary of Toponomy of Armenia and Adjacent Territories. He also authored several textbooks.

Publications

References

External links
Tadevos Hakobyan's biography
Dictionary of Toponomy of Armenia and Adjacent Territories on Nayiri.com

1917 births
1989 deaths
Soviet historians
Soviet Armenians
Soviet geographers